The Holy Family Catholic School is a coeducational Roman Catholic secondary school and sixth form serving the parishes and communities in and around the districts of Keighley, Haworth, and Skipton in West Yorkshire, England.

The school opened in May 1965. The school celebrated its 50th birthday in 2015.

Previously a voluntary aided school administered by City of Bradford Metropolitan District Council, in August 2022 The Holy Family Catholic School converted to academy status. The school is now sponsored by the Blessed Christopher Wharton Catholic Academy Trust. the school continues to be under the jurisdiction of the Roman Catholic Diocese of Leeds.

Notable alumni and staff 
James Atkin – Former pop star, member of EMF. Currently a music teacher at the school.

References 

Secondary schools in the City of Bradford
Educational institutions established in 1964
1964 establishments in England
Catholic secondary schools in the Diocese of Leeds
Academies in the City of Bradford
Buildings and structures in Keighley